Azul y Blanco (Spanish for 'Blue and White') was a weekly political newspaper published from San Pedro Sula, Honduras. It was founded by Dr. Octaviano Arias. Azul y Blanco argued from continuation of the rule of General Tiburcio Carias. It was published between December 1, 1935, and March 8, 1936.

Azul y Blanco was printed at Tipografía Cervantes, run by Héctor Pérez Estrada.

References

Defunct newspapers published in Honduras
Defunct weekly newspapers
Mass media in San Pedro Sula
Newspapers established in 1935
Publications disestablished in 1936
Spanish-language newspapers